Jacob Schum (born January 21, 1989) is an American football punter who is a free agent. He played college football at Buffalo. Schum was signed by the Cleveland Browns as an undrafted free agent in 2013. He has also been a member of the New York Jets, Tampa Bay Buccaneers, Green Bay Packers, and Tampa Bay Vipers.

Early life
Schum was born to Alan, a Hamburg, New York police officer, and Charlene Schum. Schum played football as a wide receiver and punter at Frontier High School in Hamburg.

College career
Failing to attract the attention of any Division I college football programs, Schum committed to play for the Buffalo State Bengals. After one season, Schum attempted to transfer to the University at Buffalo but the Buffalo Bulls football coaches spurned his advances. Schum continued attending Buffalo State but withdrew from the football team, opting instead to focus on training.

Before his junior year, Schum transferred to Buffalo and walked on to the football team where he was only used as a wide receiver on the scout team under Turner Gill. In 2010, under new head coach Jeff Quinn, Schum was granted a tryout at punter and was named the team's starter in each of his final two years of athletic eligibility. He was eventually awarded a scholarship.

College statistics

Professional career

Cleveland Browns
After going undrafted in the 2012 NFL Draft, Schum spent a year working odd jobs. He was selling gym memberships for the Buffalo Athletic Club in the spring of 2013 when he got a call from the Cleveland Browns, who had taken an interest in Schum at an NFL regional combine. He signed with the Cleveland Browns on March 28, 2013. On May 13, 2013, he was waived by the Browns.

Tampa Bay Buccaneers
On January 6, 2014, the Tampa Bay Buccaneers signed Schum to a reserve/future contract. He was waived by the Buccaneers on May 21, 2014.

New York Jets
Schum was signed by the New York Jets on June 19, 2014 to compete with incumbent Ryan Quigley in training camp. He was released on August 23, 2014.

Tampa Bay Buccaneers (second stint)
The Buccaneers signed Schum to their practice squad on November 14, 2014, but was waived four days later.

New York Jets (second stint)
The Jets signed Schum to a reserve/future contract on December 30, 2014. He was released on August 18, 2015.

Tampa Bay Buccaneers (third stint)

On August 26, 2015, the Buccaneers signed Schum to compete with Karl Schmitz and Michael Koenen. By September 1, Schum was the last remaining punter on the Buccaneers roster after roster cuts. Schum made his NFL debut with four punts in a game against the Tennessee Titans in September 2015, nearly four years after his final college game. On August 28, 2016, Schum was waived by the Buccaneers.

Green Bay Packers
Schum was claimed off waivers by the Green Bay Packers on August 30, 2016. He re-signed with the Packers on March 8, 2017. On June 1, 2017, he was released by the Packers.

Tampa Bay Vipers
In October 2019, Schum was put on the 2020 XFL Draft pool and was selected by the Tampa Bay Vipers in the open rounds. He had his contract terminated when the league suspended operations on April 10, 2020.

DC Defenders 
On November 18, 2022, Schum was drafted by the DC Defenders of the XFL. He was released on January 21, 2023.

NFL career statistics

Regular season

References

External links
Green Bay Packers bio
Buffalo Bulls bio

Living people
1989 births
People from Hamburg, New York
Players of American football from New York (state)
Sportspeople from Erie County, New York
American football punters
Buffalo State Bengals football players
Buffalo Bulls football players
Cleveland Browns players
Tampa Bay Buccaneers players
New York Jets players
Green Bay Packers players
Tampa Bay Vipers players